Szatmári, Szathmári, Szatmáry or Szathmáry is a Hungarian-language toponymic surname literally meaning "one from Szatmár (Satu Mare)". Notable people with this surname include:

Szatmári/Szatmari
 Ágnes Szatmári (born 1987), Romanian tennis player
 András Szatmári (born 1993), Hungarian sabre fencer
 Csaba Szatmári (born 1973), Hungarian football player
 Csaba Szatmári (footballer, born 1994) (born 1994), Hungarian football defender
 Elemér Szatmári (1926–1971), Hungarian swimmer
 George Szatmári (1457–1524), prelate in the Kingdom of Hungary
 István Szatmári (born 1997), Hungarian football player
 Lajos Szatmári (born 1944), former Romanian football player of Hungarian ethnicity
 László Szatmári (born 1977), Hungarian motorcycle speedway rider
 Lóránd Szatmári (born 1988), Romanian-born Hungarian football player
 Peter Szatmari (born 1950), Canadian researcher of autism and Asperger syndrome
 Peter Szatmari (geologist), Hungarian geologist

Szathmári/Szathmari
 Carol Szathmari (1812–1887), Austro-Hungarian-born painter, lithographer and photographer
 János Szathmári (born 1969), Hungarian handball goalkeeper
 Sándor Szathmári (1897–1974), Hungarian writer, mechanical engineer and Esperantist

See also
 Szatmary
 Szathmary

References

Hungarian-language surnames
Toponymic surnames